The Huron-Wendat Nation (or Huron-Wendat First Nation) is an Iroquoian-speaking nation that was established in the 17th century. In the French language, used by most members of the First Nation, they are known as the Nation Huronne-Wendat. The French gave the nickname “Huron” to the Wendat, meaning “boar’s head” because of the hairstyle of Huron men. Wendat (Quendat) was their confederacy name, meaning “people of the island” or "dwellers on a peninsula."

The nation inhabited the area between Lake Simcoe and Georgian Bay, historically known as Wendake (Huronia), conquered and devastated in the 17th century Beaver Wars, which prompted the surviving Hurons to move east to Quebec, under French protection. It now has two communities and reserves (Wendake 7 and Wendake 7A) at Wendake, Quebec, a municipality now enclosed within Quebec City in Canada.

The 1760 Huron-British North American Peace Treaty, lost in 1824 but rediscovered in the 1990s, showed that a large chunk of land named "Seigneurie de Sillery" (now part of Quebec City) was sold to the Hurons in 1760 by the Jesuits.  Therefore, the Huron-Wendats have a contemporary claim to this valuable land.

Today, Wendake tourism is the main economic drive, which includes a developed historic sector, a residential district and an industrial zone. As of April 2022, registered members of Huron-Wendat Nation in Wendake, Quebec consists of 4,578 members.

History 
In the late 16th century, Wendat Confederacy was formed to defend against their common enemy, which was the Iroquois Confederacy. Wendat Confederacy consisted of four allied nations, including Attinniaoenten (Bear), Atingeennonniahak (Cords), Arendaenronnon (Rock), Atahontaenrat (Deer) and Ataronchronon (Bog). However, the last group Ataronchronon (Bog) may have been a division of the Attinniaoenten (Bear) since they may have not attain full membership. Due to diseases introduced by the Europeans and a lack of firearms, in 1648 to 1650, the Wendat Confederacy was defeated by the Iroquois Confederacy. After that, Huron refugees joined with the neighboring Tionontati tribe to form Wyandot, which was a corrupted form of Wendat Confederacy.

August 27, 1999, Wendat Confederacy was reaffirmed by signing a document with four constituent members of the confederacy in the United States and Canada: Wyandotte Nation of Oklahoma (United States), Wyandot Nation of Kansas (United States), the Wyandot of Anderdon Nation (Michigan, U.S.) and the Huron Wendat of Wendake (Quebec, Canada).

Demographics 
Before the 16th century, Huron-Wendat's population was approximately 20,000 to 25,000 people. However, when diseases were brought by the Europeans around 1634 to 1642, particularly measles, influenza and smallpox, their population reduced significantly to about 9,000 people. Today, as of April 2022, the number of registered members of Huron-Wendat Nation in Wendake, Quebec consists of 4,578 members.

In the United States, there are around 5,900 people that are identified as Wyandot or Wyandotte, currently enrolling as members of the federally recognized Wyandotte Nation that has a headquarter in Wyandotte, Oklahoma.

Language 
Wendat or Huron was the spoken language of Huron-Wendat Nation in Quebec, Canada and some parts of Oklahoma in the United States, and it was traditionally spoken by Wyandot, Wyandotte or Huron people. The language was closely related to the Iroquois language.

Wyandot (or sometimes known as Wandat) is considered as a sister language to the Wendat language that was previously used in Huron-Wendat Confederacy. Some linguists saw this as a dialect or a modern form of the Wendat language. It was reported that the language is mostly used in Oklahoma, United States.

Around the second half of the 19th century, Wendat died out because there was no living speakers. However, in the 1970s and 1980s, attempts were being made to revive the dormant language by using historical dictionaries and manuscripts from Recollect and Jesuit missionaries. In 2010, the Wendat Community of Quebec and the Wyandot Nation of Oklahoma have been teaching Wendat and Wyandot (the dialect of Wendat) to their community members, respectively.

Government 
Village, tribe and confederacy made up the basic level of government system in Huron-Wendat Nation. At the village level, there were several chiefs to represent different clans, and each chief had different status (e.g: civil or war chief). Most of their status were inherited, but they could fight for that or being appointed by older women of the lineage. The chief organized a council meeting to discuss about current issues within the village, and men and women were welcomed to give opinions. The meeting for Huron-Wendat Confederacy happened once a year.

Social organization 
The Wendats were a matrilineal society in which status and property were inherited through the women's life. Property, clan membership and position could potentially be passed down.

Clan system 
Similar to other Iroquois nations, Wendat society used a matrilineal clan system which has clans named after certain animals. There are eight matrilineal clans: Turtle, Wolf, Bear, Beaver, Deer, Hawk, Porcupine, and Snake. In order to unify, each person in each clan, no matter their nation or village, was seen as related. Thus, people would have to marry a person outside of their clan.

Economy 
About 70% of the area north and west of Lake Simcoe and south and east of Georgian Bay, where Huron-Wendat nation occupied, was agricultural land. Because of this, most Huron-Wendat were farmers, and their economy was based on horticulture by growing maize, beans and squash.

Culture

Housing 
Similar to other Iroquoian-speaking people, the Huron built in longhouses that had rectangular shape with rounded roofs that were covered by bark panels. These houses were built to serve as a home for nuclear, extended family.

Clothing 
Wendat clothing was mostly made from deer and beaver hides. Their clothes were very decorative by using porcupine quills, feathers, and wampum, and red was the most favourite colour in their culture.

Men wore loincloths and moccasins on their feet, and in the winter, they wore sleeves and a cloak made of fur. On their backs, they wore fire pouches so that they could carry tobacco pipes, charms and personal belongings. Wendat men tended to smoke, so it was common for them to carry a pipe. Women wore the same thing as men, but instead of loincloths, they wore skirts.

Media

Book 
The book, Revisiting 1759, was written by author Thomas Peace and published by the University of Toronto Press in 2012. In chapter 6, Peace talks about how Huron-Wendat Nation responded to changes that happened during the conquest of Quebec from 1697 to 1791.

References

External links 
Official site of the Huron-Wendat Nation 

Wyandot
First Nations in Quebec
Quebec City